Glencairn is a historic plantation house located near Chance, Essex County, Virginia. It dates to the Colonial era, and is a long -story, six bay, brick-nogged frame dwelling. It sits on a high brick basement and is clad in 19th century weatherboard. The house is topped by a gable roof with dormers.  The house was built in several sections, with the oldest section possibly dated to 1730.

It was listed on the National Register of Historic Places in 1979.

References

Plantation houses in Virginia
Houses on the National Register of Historic Places in Virginia
Colonial architecture in Virginia
Houses completed in 1730
Houses in Essex County, Virginia
National Register of Historic Places in Essex County, Virginia
1730 establishments in the Thirteen Colonies